Lennart Ekdal (born 19 November 1953) is a Swedish journalist and television presenter.

Career 
Born in Linköping, Östergötland, he began his career in financial journalism in the 1980s and is best known for his work on several TV4 programs, starting in 1990, before leaving in 2013.

Before his success with TV4, Ekdal worked for the national public television broadcaster Sveriges Television (SVT), the daily newspaper Dagens Nyheter and the weekly business journal Veckans Affärer.

Personal life 
Ekdal is the father of the professional footballers Albin Ekdal (born 1989) and Hjalmar Ekdal (born 1998).

References

1953 births
Living people
People from Linköping
Swedish journalists
Swedish television hosts